Anabel Abarca is an American politician, currently serving in the Chicago City Council as alderperson for the 12th ward. She was appointed to the position by Mayor Lori Lightfoot and confirmed by the City Council in December 2022, following the retirement of George Cardenas. The 12th ward is on Chicago's southwest side, and includes portions of Brighton Park, McKinley Park, and Little Village.

Early life and education 
Abarca is a native of the Northwest Side of Chicago, and is the daughter of Mexican immigrants. She graduated from Taft High School in Norwood Park, and subsequently earned a bachelor's degree from DePaul University, a Master of Public Administration degree from Arizona State University, and a Juris Doctor degree from Loyola University Chicago School of Law.

Early legal and political career 
Abarca worked on Tammy Duckworth's congressional campaign in 2011, and served as an aide to U.S. Representative Mike Quigley. She later served on the boards of several non-profit organizations. From 2012 to 2016, she served as chief of staff for 12th ward alderman George Cardenas.

Chicago City Council 
In June 2022, Cardenas announced his intention to resign later in the year after winning a primary for a seat on the Cook County Board of Review. Abarca was one of four people who applied to fill the position for the remainder of the term, and was selected for appointment by Mayor Lori Lightfoot on December 12, 2022. The City Council approved her appointment in a 44–0 vote on December 14. She named public safety and city services as her top priorities upon taking office. Abarca was a candidate for a full term in the 2023 election and was endorsed by Cardenas, but lost to challenger Julia Ramirez.

Personal life 
Abaraca has lived in the McKinley Park neighborhood of Chicago since 2015.

References 

Living people
21st-century American politicians
21st-century American women politicians
Chicago City Council members
Chicago City Council members appointed by Lori Lightfoot
Illinois Democrats
Year of birth missing (living people)
American politicians of Mexican descent
DePaul University alumni
Arizona State University alumni
Loyola University Chicago School of Law alumni